Nicole Nagrani is an American IFBB Pro fitness and figure competitor (bikini category) and fitness model. She is the winner of 2011 Bikini Olympia.

Career
Born to IFBB Pro Figure competitor Kristen Nagrani and Dr. Mark Nagrani, a surgeon from Lucknow, India, Nicole was engaged in sports from an early age and started to compete in fitness at the age of 14. Her first bikini competition was NPC Ft. Lauderdale Cup in 2009 and she got her IFBB Pro Card in 2010, the year IFBB officially recognised the bikini competition category.

She is currently a medical student at SUNY Upstate Medical University in Syracuse, New York.

References

1991 births
Living people
Fitness and figure competitors
Sportspeople from Florida